is a rural district located in Gunma Prefecture, Japan. As of January 2015, the district had an estimated population of 56,994 and an area of 1,278.55 km2, with a population density of 44.6 people per square kilometer.

Towns and villages

 former Agatsuma (now part of Higashiagatsuma)
 former Azuma (now part of Higashiagatsuma)
 Kusatsu
 former Kuni (now part of Nakanojō)
 Takayama
 Tsumagoi
 Nakanojō
 Naganohara

History
The area of Agatsuma District was formerly part of Kōzuke Province, and per a census conducted at the start of the Meiji period, consisted of 42 villages administered as tenryō directly by the Tokugawa shogunate and four towns and 44 villages administered as hatamoto-territory, primarily by the Oguri-clan.

With the establishment of the municipality system on April 1, 1889, the area was organized into three towns (Nakanojō, Hara and Naganohara) and ten villages
 

1896, April 1 – Takayama village was transferred from Nishigunma District to Agatsuma District; Kuga Village was transferred to Tone District
1900, July 1 – Kusatsu Village was reorganized into Kusatsu Town and Kuni Village
1955, March 1 – Ōta, Iwajima and Sakanoue villages were merged into Hara Town
1955, April 15 – Sawada, Isama and Nakuta villages were merged into Nakanojō Town
1956, February 1 – Hara Town was merged into Agatsuma Town
 2006, March 27 – the town of Agatsuma, and the village of Azuma were merged to form the new town of Higashiagatsuma.
2010, March 28 – the village of Kuni merged into the town of Nakanojō.

Districts in Gunma Prefecture